Hormone Research in Paediatrics is a monthly peer-reviewed medical journal covering paediatric  endocrinology published by  Karger Publishers and the editor-in-chief is S. Cianfarani, Rome. It is an official journal of the European Society for Paediatric Endocrinology, the Pediatric Endocrine Society and the Sociedade Latino-Americana de Endocrinologia Pediátrica.

History 
The journal was established in 1970 as Hormones and renamed Hormone Research in 1973, before obtaining its current title in 2011. The founding editor-in-chief was  M. Marois, who was succeeded in 1976 by J. Girard. From 1996 to 2003 the journal was edited by M.B. Ranke, who was succeeded in 2004 by  P. Czernichow.

Abstracting and indexing 
The journal is abstracted and indexed in:

According to the Karger Publishers, the journal has a 2019 impact factor of 2.324.

References

External links 
 
 European Society for Paediatric Endocrinology
 Pediatric Endocrine Society

Publications established in 1970
Endocrinology journals
English-language journals
Karger academic journals
Pediatrics journals
Monthly journals